Cosmote Cinema is a pay television service available in Greece that broadcasts blockbuster movies and hit series. It launched on 5 November 2012 as OTE Cinema. It was renamed of 14 November 2016. It is owned by OTE, who own and operate Cosmote TV a satellite television service and Cosmote Sport—a sports channel. Cosmote Cinema is a 24/7 service and it features hit series from UK and blockbusters movies from Greece and abroad. Also, it features shows with showbiz news, making of, deleted scenes and backstage.

Recently, Cosmote Cinema has entered into an exclusive agreement with Walt Disney Pictures. As a result, it gives Cosmote Cinema exclusive rights to the coverage of the Academy Awards. It also has agreements in place with Paramount Pictures and Universal Pictures.

Channels and content
Cosmote Cinema operates four multiplex channels:
Cosmote Cinema 1HD: The premiere's channel, features blockbusters, premieres, family, action and adventure movies.
Cosmote Cinema 2HD: It features comedy, romance, horror movies. It also features favourite selections from great movies that stood out due to the actors, directors, awards or box office, and as well as thematic evenings with special cinema tributes.
Cosmote Cinema 3: It features Greek movies from 1960 to today.
Cosmote Series HD: It features hit series.

Special Events
Cosmote Cinema 1HD and Cosmote Cinema 2HD features special events such as the Academy Awards and European Film Awards.

Hit Series
Cosmote Series HD features all of the following series.

Current

A Discovery of Witches
A Million Little Things
Berlin Station
Better Things
Billions
Charmed
Designated Survivor
Deutschland 86
Fargo
FBI
Happy!
I Feel Bad
Jamestown
Knightfall
Last Week Tonight with John Oliver
Luther
MacGyver
Madam Secretary
Magnum P.I.
Manifest
Mary Kills People
McMafia
Mr. Robot
New Amsterdam
Orange Is the New Black
Peaky Blinders
Private Eyes
Riviera
Sherlock
The Affair
The Bold Type
The Durrells
The Good Place
The Last Kingdom
The New Pope
The Resident
The Rookie
Tin Star
Top of the Lake
Trapped
Travelers
Urban Myths
Victoria
Will & Grace
Wynonna Earp

Former

Aquarius
Atlantis
Beowulf: Return to the Shieldlands
Chasing Life
Chicago Justice
Childhood's End
Colony
Conviction
DCI Banks
Defiance
Dominion
Doubt
Downton Abbey
Emerald City
Extant
Fortitude
From Dusk till Dawn: The Series
From the Earth to the Moon
Girlfriends' Guide to Divorce
Heartbeat
Hemlock Grove
Heroes
Heroes Reborn
House of Cards
Ice
Imposters
Madoff
Mapp and Lucia
Midnight, Texas
Mozart in the Jungle
No Tomorrow
Oliver Twist
Orphan Black
Ripper Street
Rock & Chips
Salvation
Satisfaction
Six
South of Hell
SS-GB
Star Trek: The Original Series
Taken
Texas Rising
The Great Indoors
The Hollow Crown
The Musketeers
The Mystery of Edwin Drood
The Odd Couple
Twin Peaks
Twin Peaks: The Return
Unreal
War & Peace
Zen
Zoo

Original programming
Dia Tayta a legal comedy drama by Lakis Lazopoulos, co-production with the terrestrial channel Alpha TV. It premiered on 4 November 2013 on OTE Cinema 2 and on 11 February 2014 on Alpha TV.

External links
Site of Cosmote TV

Movie channels in Greece
Television channels in Greece
Greek-language television stations
Television channels and stations established in 2012
Pay television